The Toledo Jeeps were a professional basketball team that played in the National Basketball League from 1946 to 1948.  As with many other NBL teams, they owed their name to an industry of their hometown, in this case the Willys Jeep Plant.  They played their games at the University of Toledo Field House.

The 1946–47 team featured players such as Chips Sobek, Hal Tidrick, Jule Rivlin and rookie Paul Seymour.  Rivlin served as the player-coach. It went 21–23 and qualified for the playoffs, where it lost to the Fort Wayne Zollner Pistons.  It would, however, be invited to the 1947 World Professional Basketball Tournament, where it finished 2nd.

In the 1947–48 NBL season, Sobek, Tidrick and Rivlin returned, and were joined by Dick Mehen and Harry Boykoff.  The team finished with a record of 22–37 and missed the playoffs.  The 1948 season proved to be the Jeeps' last; they were replaced for the NBL's final campaign with the Waterloo Hawks, who inherited Mehen and Boykoff.

References

 
Basketball teams established in 1946
Basketball teams disestablished in 1948
1946 establishments in Ohio
1948 disestablishments in Ohio